The 2002 Georgia gubernatorial election was held on November 5, 2002. Incumbent Democratic Governor Roy Barnes sought re-election to a second term as governor. State Senator Sonny Perdue emerged as the Republican nominee from a crowded and hotly contested primary, and he faced off against Barnes, who had faced no opponents in his primary election, in the general election. Though Barnes had been nicknamed "King Roy" due to his unique ability to get his legislative priorities passed, he faced a backlash among Georgia voters due to his proposal to change the state flag from its Confederate design. Ultimately, Perdue was able to defeat incumbent Governor Barnes and became the first Republican to serve as governor of the state since Reconstruction. The result was widely considered a major upset.

Democratic primary

Candidates
Roy Barnes, incumbent Governor of Georgia

Results

Republican primary

Candidates
Sonny Perdue, State Senator from Bonaire
Linda Schrenko, Superintendent of Public Instruction
Bill Byrne, chairman of the Cobb County Commission

Results

General election

Predictions

Results

See also
2002 United States gubernatorial elections
2002 United States Senate election in Georgia
2002 United States House of Representatives elections in Georgia
State of Georgia
Governors of Georgia

References

External links

2002 United States gubernatorial elections
2002
Gubernatorial